Year in topic Year 1012 (MXII) was a leap year starting on Tuesday (link will display the full calendar) of the Julian calendar.

Events 
 By place 

 Europe 
 April 12 – Oldřich, Duke of Bohemia, deposes his brother Jaromír, who flees to Poland. Oldřich recognises the suzerainty of King Henry II of Germany over Bohemia. He secures his rule by suppressing the Vršovci insurgents.

 England 
 April – King Æthelred the Unready resumes the payment of Danegeld (48,000 pounds of silver) in an attempt to buy off Viking raiders.

 Ireland 
 Máel Mórda mac Murchada starts a rebellion against High King Brian Boru in Ireland, which ends in 1014 at the Battle of Clontarf.

 Scotland 
 King Malcolm II of Scotland reputedly defeats a Danish army at Cruden Bay.

 Arabian Empire 
 Summer – The climax of the Bedouin anti-Fatimid rebellion in Palestine is reached. Abu'l-Futuh al-Hasan ibn Ja'far is acclaimed as anti-Caliph with the title of al-Rashid bi-llah ("Righteous with God").

 Mexico 
 The Tepanec tribe settles on the western region of Lake Texcoco. The lineage starts when the Chichimeca chieftain Acolhua marries Cuetlaxochitzin, daughter of Xolotl, another Chichimeca chieftain.

 Japan 
 February – Fujiwara no Kenshi, daughter of the powerful court official Fujiwara no Michinaga, is elevated to Empress Consort (Chūgū). The Emperor's first wife, Fujiwara no Seishi, is also elevated to Empress (Kōgō) at the same time but Michinaga ensures that court officials do not attend her ceremony. 
 August 12 – Death of Ōe no Masahira, husband of poet and former palace lady-in-waiting Akazome Emon, who writes a number of mourning poems to him.
 Fujiwara no Yorimichi, second son of Fujiwara no Michinaga, marries the daughter of Michinaga's enemy Fujiwara no Kintō, eventually reconciling the families. Another son of Michinaga, Fujiwara no Akinobu, causes scandal by becoming a priest without telling his parents, but they eventually accept his decision.

 By topic 
 Religion 
 April 19 – Ælfheah, archbishop of Canterbury in England, is murdered by his Danish captors at Greenwich (after refusing to pay a ransom of 3,000 pounds for his release).
 May 12 – Pope Sergius IV dies after a 3-year pontificate at Rome. He is succeeded by Benedict VIII as the 143rd pope of the Catholic Church.
 Approximate date – Camaldolese order established by Romuald in Tuscany.

Births 
 August 19 – Baldwin V, count of Flanders (d. 1067) 
 Benedict IX, pope of the Catholic Church (approximate date)
 Cai Xiang, Chinese calligrapher, official and poet (d. 1067)
 Durandus of Troarn, French theologian (approximate date)
 García Sánchez III, king of Pamplona (approximate date)
 Guo, Chinese empress of the Song dynasty (d. 1035)
 Maria Dobroniega of Kiev, duchess of Poland (d. 1087)
 Marpa Lotsawa, Tibetan Buddhist teacher (d. 1097)
 Rongzom Mahapandita, Tibetan Buddhist scholar (d. 1088)
 Theobald III of Blois, French nobleman (d. 1089)

Deaths 
 April 1 – Herman III, duke of Swabia 
 April 19 – Ælfheah, archbishop of Canterbury
 May 12 – Sergius IV, pope of the Catholic Church (b. 970)
 May 26 – Erluin II, monk and abbot of Gembloux
 June 9
 Tagino, archbishop of Magdeburg
 Unger, bishop of Poznań
 August 12 – Walthard, archbishop of Magdeburg
 September 12 – Ad-Da'i Yusuf, Zaidi imam and ruler
 October 18 – Coloman of Stockerau, Irish pilgrim
 December 22 – Baha' al-Dawla, Buyid emir of Iraq
 Erluin, archdeacon and bishop of Cambrai
 Gaston II Centule, viscount of Béarn
 Gundemaro Pinióliz, Spanish nobleman
 Guy of Anderlecht (or Guido), Christian saint
 Ibn Faradi, Moorish scholar and historian (b. 962)
 John II Crescentius, consul and patrician of Rome
 John Morosini (the Blessed), Venetian abbot
 Otto, duke of Lower Lorraine (approximate date)
 Qabus, Ziyarid emir of Gorgan and Tabaristan
 Roger I, count of Carcassonne (approximate date)
 Tedald of Canossa, Italian nobleman

References